An art name (pseudonym or pen name), also known by its native names hào (in Mandarin), gō (in Japanese), ho (in Korean), and tên hiệu (in Vietnamese), is a professional name used by East Asian artists, poets and writers. The word and the concept originated in China, where it was used as nicknames of the educated, then became popular in other East Asian countries (especially in Japan, Korea, Vietnam, and the former Kingdom of Ryukyu).

In some cases, artists adopted different pseudonyms at different stages of their career, usually to mark significant changes in their life. Extreme practitioners of this tendency were Tang Yin of the Ming dynasty, who had more than ten hao, and Hokusai of Japan, who in the period 1798 to 1806 alone used no fewer than six.

History

China

In Chinese culture, Hao refers to honorific names made by oneself or given by others when one is in middle age. After one's gaining the Hao, other persons may then call such a person by one's Hao even without such a person being presented . Hao usually is made by a person oneself, but sometimes is given by a high-ranked official or even is bestowed by the monarch. 

The use of this name as a nom de plume or artistic name, however, appears to have begun only during the Six Dynasties period, with Tao Yuanming and Ge Hong among the first literati to have given themselves Hao.

Art names came into vogue during the Tang dynasty, during which time they could either be coined by the persons themselves, or given to them as a name by others. Most Hao can be placed within a few categories: 

 Hao derived from the locations or characteristics of the person's residence. For instance, Tao Yuanming was Wuliu Xiansheng, "Mister Five-Willows", while Su Shi was Dongpo Jushi, "Householder of the Eastern Slope", after his residence while exiled in Huangzhou. These were mostly self-coined. 
 Hao derived from certain well known sayings by the person. For example, Ouyang Xiu was known as Liuyi Jushi, "Householder of the Six Ones", after his self description as "One myriad books, one thousand inscriptions, one qin, one game of chess, one flask of wine and one old man". 
 Hao derived from one's famous poetic lines or images. These were most often given by others in admiration. Li Bai, for his free-spirited behaviour, was known as Zhe Xianren, "Banished Immortal"; while the poet He Zhu was known as He Meizi, "He the Plum", after an acclaimed line about yellow plums. 
 Hao derived from one's official posts, birthplace, or a place where they served as officials. Du Fu was known as Du Gongbu, "Du of the Ministry of Works", having briefly been a senior officer in that ministry. Tang Xianzu was called "Tang of Nanhai" for his birthplace. 

By the Song Dynasty, the majority of literati called each other by their art names, which in turn often changed; this situation continued up to the 20th century.

Japan

In early modern Japan, a woodblock print artist's first gō was usually given to them by the head of the school (a group of artists and apprentices, with a senior as master of the school) in which they initially studied; this gō usually included one of the characters of the master's gō. For example, one of Hokusai's earliest pseudonyms was Shunrō; his master Katsukawa Shunshō having granted him the character 'shun' from his own name.

One can often trace the relationship among artists with this, especially in later years, when it seems to have been fairly (although not uniformly) systematic (particularly in the Utagawa school) that the first character of the pupil's gō was the last of the master's gō.

Thus, an artist named Toyoharu had a student named Toyohiro, who, in turn, had as a pupil the famous landscape artist Hiroshige.

Another figure who studied under Toyoharu was the principal head of the Utagawa school, Toyokuni. Toyokuni had pupils named Kunisada and Kuniyoshi. Kuniyoshi, in turn, had as a student Yoshitoshi, whose pupils included Toshikata.

Reused names

In some schools, in particular the main Utagawa school, the gō of the most senior member was adopted when the master died and the chief pupil assumed his position. Perhaps as a sign of respect, artists might take the gō of a previous artist. This makes attribution difficult. The censors' seal helps determine a particular print's date. Style also is significant. For example, Kunisada, once he changed his gō to Toyokuni,  initiated the practice of signing prints with a signature in the elongated oval toshidama ('New Year's Jewel') seal of the Utagawa school, an unusual cartouche with the zig-zag in the upper right-hand corner. His successors continued this practice.

In modern scholarship on the subject, a Roman numeral identifies an artist in the sequence of artists using a gō. Thus, Kunisada I is also known as Toyokuni III, since he was the third artist to use that gō.

See also
Courtesy name
Pen name

Notes

References

Frederic, Louis (2002). "Gō". Japan Encyclopedia. Cambridge, Massachusetts: Harvard University Press.
Lane, Richard (1978). Images of the Floating World. Old Saybrook, CT: Konecky & Konecky.

East Asian art
East Asian traditions
Pseudonyms